Linda Leppänen née Välimäki (born 31 May 1990) is a Finnish retired ice hockey forward and coach. Representing , she won bronze medals at the Winter Olympic Games in 2010 and 2018 and at the IIHF Women's World Championships in 2015 and 2017, and a silver medal at the 2019 IIHF Women's World Championship. In total, she played 167 matches with the Finnish national team. Leppänen announced her retirement from top athletic competition several months after achieving her career highlight world championship silver medal.

Leppänen served as head coach of Ilves Tampere in the Naisten Liiga (NSML) during the 2020–21 and 2021–21 seasons. She resigned from the position in April 2022, motivated by a desire to spend more time with her three young children.

Career statistics

References

External links
 
 
 
 

1990 births
Living people
Espoo Blues Naiset players
Finnish ice hockey coaches
Finnish women's ice hockey forwards
Ice hockey players at the 2010 Winter Olympics
Ice hockey players at the 2014 Winter Olympics
Ice hockey players at the 2018 Winter Olympics
Ilves Naiset players
Medalists at the 2010 Winter Olympics
Medalists at the 2018 Winter Olympics
Naisten Liiga (ice hockey) coaches
Olympic bronze medalists for Finland
Olympic ice hockey players of Finland
Olympic medalists in ice hockey
People from Ylöjärvi
Sportspeople from Pirkanmaa